Piet Huyg (19 March 1951 – 6 December 2019) was a Dutch footballer who played as a defender. He played 349 games with HFC Haarlem, mostly in the Dutch Eerste Divisie. Haarlem qualified for the  1982–83 UEFA Cup and Huyg scored the team’s only goal in the second round match against Spartak Moscow.

In 1976, Huyg opened a sporting goods store in Haarlem which he operated until turning it over to his daughter.

Huyg died on 6 December 2019 at the age of 68. He had been suffering from Alzheimer’s Disease.

References

External links
 

1951 births
2019 deaths
Dutch footballers
Association football defenders
HFC Haarlem players
Eredivisie players
Eerste Divisie players
People from Velsen
Footballers from North Holland